Dipterocarpus is a genus of flowering plants and the type genus of family Dipterocarpaceae.

Dipterocarpus is the third-largest and most diverse genus among the Dipterocarpaceae. The species are well known for timber, but less acknowledged for use in traditional herbal medicine. The genus has about 70 species, occurring in South Asia and Southeast Asia, from Sri Lanka and India to the Philippines. It is an important component of dipterocarp forests. Its generic name comes from Greek and means "two-winged fruits".

The greatest diversity of Dipterocarpus species occurs on Borneo, with many endemic to the island. The oldest fossil of the genus, and Dipterocarpaceae, is from the latest Cretaceous (Maastrichtian) Intertrappean Beds of India.

Uses
The genus is of considerable importance as timber trees and for producing resinous oil, sold under the trade name Keruing, although not as important as Shorea species. D. turbinatus, gurjan, is a major commercial timber species found in the Andaman islands. Gurjan wood is very important for making plywood.

Accepted species
There are 65 accepted species:

Dipterocarpus acutangulus Vesque – Peninsular Thailand, Peninsular Malaysia, and Borneo
Dipterocarpus alatus Roxb. ex G.Don – northeastern India, Sri Lanka, Indochina, Peninsular Malaysia, and Philippines
Dipterocarpus applanatus Slooten – Borneo
Dipterocarpus baudii Korth. – Bangladesh, Indochina, Peninsular Malaysia, and Sumatra
Dipterocarpus borneensis Sooten – Borneo and Sumatra
Dipterocarpus bourdillonii Brandis – southwestern India
Dipterocarpus caudatus  – 
Dipterocarpus caudiferus Merr. – Borneo
Dipterocarpus chartaceus Symington – Peninsular Thailand and Peninsular Malaysia
Dipterocarpus cinereus Slooten – central Sumatra
Dipterocarpus concavus Foxw. – Peninsular Malaysia and Sumatra
Dipterocarpus condorensis Pierre – Vietnam (Con Dao) and Philippines (Luzon and Mindanao)
Dipterocarpus confertus Slooten – Borneo
Dipterocarpus conformis Slooten – northern Sumatra
Dipterocarpus coriaceus Slooten – Peninsular Malaysia, Sumatra, and Borneo
Dipterocarpus cornutus Dyer – Peninsular Malaysia, Sumatra, and Borneo
Dipterocarpus costatus C.F.Gaertn. – Bangladesh, Indochina, and Peninsular Malaysia
Dipterocarpus costulatus Slooten – Peninsular Malaysia, Sumatra, and Borneo
Dipterocarpus crinitus Dyer – Peninsular Thailand, Peninsular Malaysia, Sumatra, and Borneo
Dipterocarpus cuspidatus P.S.Ashton – Borneo (northeastern Sarawak)
Dipterocarpus dyeri Pierre ex Laness. – Indochina, northern Peninsular Malaysia, and northwestern Borneo
Dipterocarpus elongatus Korth. – Peninsular Malaysia, Sumatra, and Borneo
Dipterocarpus eurhynchus Miq. – Peninsular Malaysia, Sumatra, Borneo, southern Philippines
Dipterocarpus fagineus Vesque – Peninsular Malaysia, Sumatra, and Borneo
Dipterocarpus fusiformis P.S.Ashton – northeastern Borneo
Dipterocarpus geniculatus Vesque – Borneo
Dipterocarpus glabrigemmatus P.S.Ashton – Borneo
Dipterocarpus glandulosus Thwaites – southwestern Sri Lanka
Dipterocarpus globosus Vesque – Borneo
Dipterocarpus gracilis Blume – Assam to western Malesia and the Philippines
Dipterocarpus grandiflorus(Blanco) Blanco – Bangladesh to Indochina, western Malesia, and the Philippines. The wood is sold as keruing timber
Dipterocarpus hasseltii Blume – Indochina, western Malesia, Philippines, and Lesser Sunda Islands
Dipterocarpus hispidus Thwaites – Sri Lanka
Dipterocarpus humeratus Slooten – Sumatra and Borneo
Dipterocarpus indicus Bedd. – southwestern India
Dipterocarpus insignis Thwaites – Sri Lanka
Dipterocarpus intricatus Dyer – Thailand, Cambodia, Laos, and Vietnam
Dipterocarpus kerrii King – Myanmar, Thailand, Peninsular Malaysia, Sumatra, Borneo, and the Philippines. The wood is sold as keruing timber
Dipterocarpus kunstleri King – Peninsular Malaysia, Sumatra, Borneo, and the Philippines
Dipterocarpus lamellatus Hook.f. – Borneo (southwestern Sabah)
Dipterocarpus littoralis Blume – southern Java
Dipterocarpus lowii Hook.f. – Peninsular Malaysia, Sumatra, and Borneo
Dipterocarpus mundus Slooten – central Borneo
Dipterocarpus nudus Vesque – northwestern Borneo
Dipterocarpus oblongifolius Blume – southern Peninsular Thailand, Peninsular Malaysia, and Borneo
Dipterocarpus obtusifolius Teijsm. ex Miq. – Indochina and Peninsular Malaysia
Dipterocarpus ochraceus Meijer – northern Borneo
Dipterocarpus orbicularis Foxw. – Philippines (Luzon)
Dipterocarpus pachyphyllus Meijer – northern and northwestern Borneo
Dipterocarpus palembanicus Slooten – Peninsular Malaysia, Sumatra, and Borneo
Dipterocarpus perakensis P.S.Ashton – Peninsular Malaysia
Dipterocarpud pseudocornutus P.S.Ashton – Philippines
Dipterocarpus retusus Blume – Assam and Tibet to China (Yunnan), Indochina, Peninsular Malaysia, Sumatra, Java, and Lesser Sunda Islands
Dipterocarpus rigidus Ridl. – Peninsular Malaysia, Sumatra, and Borneo
Dipterocarpus rotundifolius Foxw. – Peninsular Malaysia
Dipterocarpus sarawakensis Slooten – eastern Peninsular Malaysia and Borneo. Locally called the Sarawak keruing
Dipterocarpus scaber Buch.-Ham. – Bangladesh
Dipterocarpus semivestitus Slooten – Peninsular Malaysia (Perak) and southeastern Borneo
Dipterocarpus stellatus Vesque – western Borneo
Dipterocarpus sublamellatus Foxw. – Peninsular Malaysia, Sumatra, and Borneo
Dipterocarpus tempehes Slooten – Borneo
Dipterocarpus tuberculatus Roxb. – Bangladesh to Indochina
Dipterocarpus turbinatus C.F.Gaertn. – eastern India to Indochina. The wood is sold as keruing timber
Dipterocarpus validus Blume – northern and eastern Borneo to the Philippines
Dipterocarpus verrucosus Foxw. ex Slooten – Peninsular Thailand, Peninsular Malaysia, Sumatra, and Borneo
Dipterocarpus zeylanicus Thwaites – Sri Lanka

References

External links

 
Malvales genera